The women's mass start race of the 2014–15 ISU Speed Skating World Cup 4, arranged in the Thialf arena in Heerenveen, Netherlands, was held on 14 December 2014.

Ivanie Blondin of Canada won the race, while Kim Bo-reum of South Korea came second, and Irene Schouten of the Netherlands came third.

Results
The race took place on Sunday, 14 December, scheduled in the afternoon session, at 17:11.

References

Women mass start
4